The South Tippah School District is a public school district based in Ripley, Mississippi (USA).

In addition to Ripley, the district also serves the towns of Dumas and Blue Mountain as well as rural areas in southern Tippah County.

Schools
Ripley High School
Ripley Middle School
Ripley Elementary
Blue Mountain School
Pine Grove School

Demographics

2006-07 school year
There were a total of 2,731 students enrolled in the South Tippah School District during the 2006–2007 school year. The gender makeup of the district was 49% female and 51% male. The racial makeup of the district was 23.69% African American, 70.08% White, 6.15% Hispanic, and 0.07% Asian. 48.2% of the district's students were eligible to receive free lunch.

Previous school years

Accountability statistics

See also
List of school districts in Mississippi

References

External links
 

Education in Tippah County, Mississippi
School districts in Mississippi